Haplogroup D-M55 (M64.1/Page44.1) also known as Haplogroup D1a2a is a Y-chromosome haplogroup. It is one of two branches of Haplogroup D1a. The other is D1a1, which is found with high frequency in Tibetans and other Tibeto-Burmese populations and geographical close groups. D is also distributed with low to medium frequency in Central Asia, East Asia, and Mainland Southeast Asia.

Haplogroup D-M55 is found in about 33% of present-day Japanese males. It has been found in fourteen of a sample of sixteen or 87.5% of a sample of Ainu males in one study published in 2004 and in three of a sample of four or 75% of a sample of Ainu males in another study published in 2005 in which some individuals from the 2004 study may have been retested. It is currently the most common Y-DNA haplogroup in Japan if O1-F265 and O2-M122 (TMRCA approx. 30,000 ~ 35,000 ybp) are considered as separate haplogroups. It is considered that Haplogroup D-M55 was born in Japan 38,000-37,000 years before present.

In 2017 it was confirmed that the Japanese branch of haplogroup D-M55 is distinct and isolated from other D-branches since more than 53,000 years ago. The split in D1a probably happened near the Tibetan Plateau.

History 

Among the subgroups of Haplogroup D, the ancestor of D-M55 went eastward to reach the Japanese archipelago. According to Michael F. Hammer of the University of Arizona, haplogroup D originated near the Tibetan Plateau and migrated into Japan were it eventually became D-M55. Mitsuru Sakitani said that Haplogroup D1 came from Tibet to northern Kyushu via the Altai Mountains and the Korean Peninsula more than, and Haplogroup D-M55 (D1a2a) was born in the Japanese archipelago.

Recent studies suggest that D-M55 became dominant during the late Jōmon period, shortly before the arrival of the Yayoi, suggesting a population boom and bust.

Frequency
The average frequency in Japanese is about 33%. High frequencies are found in various places in Japan, especially in Hokkaidō, eastern Honshū, and Okinawa.

Ainu people：87.5%（Tajima et al. 2004）
Asahikawa (Hokkaido): 63.7% (estimated from Y-STR haplotypes)
Chiba： 45.5%
Tokyo： 40.4% (21/57 = 36.8% JPT, 23/52 = 44.2%)
Okinawa: 37.6% (0/7 Hateruma, 1/20 = 5.0% Iriomote, 8/29 = 27.6% Katsuren, 10/32 = 31.3% Yomitan, 16/49 = 32.7% Ishigaki, 13/38 = 34.2% Miyako, 13/36 = 36.1% Haebaru, 7/19 = 36.8% Gushikami, 35/87 = 40.2% Okinawa estimated from Y-STR haplotypes, 38/80 = 47.5% Itoman, 25/45 = 55.6% Okinawa)
Kanto region: 37.6%
Nagoya: 34.3% (estimated from Y-STR haplotypes)
Sapporo： 33.9% (100/302 = 33.1%, 72/206 = 35.0%)
Kawasaki： 33.0%
Shizuoka：32.8%
Kanazawa： 32.6% (97/298 = 32.6%, 76/232 = 32.8%)
Aomori： 31.1% (22/79 = 27.8%, 11/27 = 40.7%)
Kyushu： 30.2% (29/104 = 27.9% Kyushu, 90/300 = 30.0% Nagasaki, 39/129 = 30.2% Saga, 34/102 = 33.3% Fukuoka)
Tokushima： 29.9% (18/70 = 25.7%, 119/388 = 30.7%）
Micronesia：9.5％（Hammer et al. 2006）
South Korea: 4.0% (Hammer et al. 2006), 3.8% (estimated from Y-STR haplotypes), 1.6% (Kim et al. 2011)
Timor Island：0.2%（Meryanne et al. 2014）

Ancient DNA
A Jōmon period man excavated from Funadomari remains (about 3,800 - 3,500 YBP) in Rebun Island in Hokkaido belongs to Haplogroup D1a2a2a(D-CTS220).

The analysis of an Jōmon sample (Ikawazu) and an ancient sample from the Tibetan Plateau (Chokhopani, Ch) found only partially shared ancestry, suggesting a positive genetic bottleneck regarding the spread of haplogroup D from an ancient population related to the Tibetan Chokhopani sample (and modern Tibeto-Burmese groups).

Phylogenetic tree
By ISOGG tree（Version: 14.151）.

DE (YAP)
D (CTS3946)
D1 (M174/Page30, IMS-JST021355, Haplogroup D-M174)
D1a (CTS11577)　
D1a1 (F6251/Z27276)
D1a1a (M15)　Tibet
D1a1b (P99)　Tibet, Mongol, Central Asia
D1a2(Z3660)
D1a2a (M64.1/Page44.1, M55) 　 Japan(Yamato people、Ryukyuan people、Ainu people)
D1a2b (Y34637)　Andaman Islands（Onge people, Jarawa people）
D1b (L1378) 　 Philippines
D2 (A5580.2) 　Nigeria, Saudi Arabia, Syria

References 

D-M55